Viminiconus is subgenus of sea snails, marine gastropod mollusks in the genus Conasprella,  family Conidae, the cone snails and their allies.

In the new classification of the family Conidae by Puillandre N., Duda T.F., Meyer C., Olivera B.M. & Bouchet P. (2015), Dalliconus has become a subgenus of Conasprella: Conasprella (Dalliconus) Tucker & Tenorio, 2009 represented as Conasprella Thiele, 1929

Species
 Viminiconus vimineus (Reeve, 1849): synonym of Conasprella viminea (Reeve, 1849) (alternate representation)

References

 Tucker J.K. & Tenorio M.J. (2009) Systematic classification of Recent and fossil conoidean gastropods. Hackenheim: Conchbooks. 296 pp. page(s): 152

External links
 To World Register of Marine Species

Conidae
Gastropod subgenera